Meaningless may refer to:
Meaningless (album), the debut solo album of singer and songwriter Jon Brion
"Meaningless," a song by The Magnetic Fields from their 1999 album 69 Love Songs

See also 
 
 Pointless
 Senseless